Cigacice  is a village in the administrative district of Gmina Sulechów, within Zielona Góra County, Lubusz Voivodeship, in western Poland.

The village has a population of 750.

References

Cigacice